(born May 26, 1977) is a Japanese actress and model.

Career 
In 1999, Ito became the Asahi Beer "image girl" and a model under an exclusive contract to CanCam magazine. She also appeared in commercials for Gateway computers and Choya Umeshu.

In 2005, she appeared in the TV drama series Densha Otoko as the love interest of the otaku protagonist.  She also appears in ads for Shiseido's MAQuillAGE line of cosmetics (along with Chiaki Kuriyama, Ryoko Shinohara and Yuri Ebihara) and Seiko watches, in addition to being the current Vodafone model in Japan, following on from Yu Yamada. She also provided the look and voice for Q's assistant Miss Nagai in the game James Bond 007: Everything or Nothing.  Misaki Ito also starred in the 2002 movie Ju-on (a.k.a. The Grudge).

Personal life
The couple first met in Hawaii at a wedding of a friend in November 2008. Ito gave birth to a daughter on June 27, 2010. In March 2015 she announced her second pregnancy. She gave birth to a son on June 23, 2015 (four days short of her daughter's fifth birthday). It was announced on Ito's official blog on May 1, 2019 that Ito gave birth to a baby girl, her third child, in late 2018. As of 2020, the family resides in Hawaii.

Filmography

Movies
 (2002)
 (2002)
 (2002)
 (2002)
9 Souls (2003)
 (2004)
  (2005)
About Love (2005)
Tsubakiyama: Kachou no Nanoka-kan (2006)
Last Love (2007)
Tengoku de Kimi ni Aetara (2007)

TV dramas
Love Complex (2000)
Shin Omizu no Hanamichi (2001)
Beauty 7 (2001)
Suiyoubi no Jouji (2001)
Gokusen (2002)
Lunch no Joou (2002)
You're Under Arrest (2002)
Blackjack ni Yoroshiku (2003)
Yoomigaeri (2003)
Tokyo Love Cinema (2003)
Ryuuten no ouhi - Saigo no koutei (2003)
Kunimitsu no Matsuri (2003)
Itoshi Kimie (2004)
HOTMAN 2 (2004 TBS)
Tiger & Dragon (2005)
Densha Otoko (2005)
Kiken na Aneki (2005)
Sapuri (2006)
Densha Otoko DX~Saigo no Seizen (2006)
Maison Ikkoku (2007)
Yama Onna Kabe Onna (2007)Ejison No Haha (2008)

Commercials
Shiseido (2005)
Hitachi
Vodafone
Choya
Nestle Japan
Mazda
Seiko
All Nippon Airways
Daiwa Securities

Video gamesJames Bond 007: Everything or Nothing'' (2004)

Awards and nominations

Awards

 Best Smile of the Year (2003)
 15th Japan Jewelry Best Dresser Prize
 29th Elan d'or Awards: Newcomer of the Year (2005)
 28th Japan Academy Film Prize: Newcomer Prize (2005)
 34th Best Dresser Prize
 43rd Golden Arrow Prize - Broadcasting and drama section
 19th DVD Best Talent Prize
 1st Japan Golden Raspberry Award
 24th Diamond Personality Prize

References

External links
Official home page

1977 births
Living people
Actors from Fukushima Prefecture
Japanese female models
Japanese film actresses
Japanese television actresses
Ken-On artists
Models from Fukushima Prefecture
20th-century Japanese actresses
21st-century Japanese actresses